Ulakam Chuttum Valiban (Tranls. Globetrotting Youngster) is a 2011 Malayalam comedy film directed by Raj Babu.It stars Jayaram, Biju Menon, Vandana Menon and Mithra Kurian in the lead roles. The film got poor reviews and ended up as a flop.

Plot 
Jayashankar is a wholesale vegetable vendor who lives with his mother and only sister Kalyani. Jayashankar is in debt and goes to city to meet his relative Sethumadhavan to borrow some money to straighten things. There he finds out that his relative is not a successful businessman but rather, a successful thief. He recruits Jayashankar to thievery and throughout the movie, everyone is confused whether Jayashankar is a thief or a Sub-inspector. Unexpectedly, TV channel Presenter Varsha and her brother CI Sajan Joseph enters the life of Jayashankar. Varsha wants Jayashanker to appear in her Street Reality show programme. Sajan Joseph, who is vain and enamored with his own personality and beauty. In the end, Sajan Joseph and Jayashankar joins hands to bring down a corrupt politician and care for his family.

Cast 
 Jayaram as SI Jayashankar
 Biju Menon as CI Sajan Joseph
 Mithra Kurian as Kalyani (Jayashankar's sister)
 Vandana Menon as Varsha 
 Lena as Annie 
 Suraj Venjaramoodu as Chengiri Sethumadhavan (Jayashankar's cousin)
 Salim Kumar as Benjamin D. Franklin (Trainer of the thieves)
 Bijukuttan as Thankachan
 Kottayam Nazeer as Jayashankar's friend
 Suresh Krishna as Dhathan (Politician)
 Abu Salim as SP Krishnakumar IPS
 Kalabhavan Shajon as Additional SI
 Priyanka as Civil Police Officer
 Pradeep Prabhakar as Civil Police Officer
 Mohan Ayeroor as Commissioner
 Narayanankutty as Vinayaka Panicker (Astrologist)
 Janardhanan as Jayashankar's uncle
 Lalu Alex as IG Hameed IPS
 Sajitha Betti as Dhathan's wife
 Shobha Mohan as Jayashankar's mother
 Ramesh Valiyashala as Party Member 
 Sadiq
 Deepika Mohan
 Shalini

References 

2010s Malayalam-language films